The Connecticut Department of Emergency Management and Homeland Security (DEMHS) is a state agency of Connecticut. Its headquarters are on the 6th floor of the 25 Sigourney Street building in Hartford.

References

External links

 Connecticut Department of Emergency Management and Homeland Security

State agencies of Connecticut
State departments of homeland security of the United States